The 2017–18 New Mexico Lobos women's basketball team will represent the University of New Mexico during the 2017–18 NCAA Division I women's basketball season. The Lobos, led by second year head coach Mike Bradbury. They play their home games at Dreamstyle Arena with 1 game in the WNIT at Johnson Gymnasium and were a member of the Mountain West Conference. They finished the season 25–11, 10–8 in Mountain West play to finish in sixth place. They advanced to the quarterfinals of the Mountain West Conference women's basketball tournament where they lost to Wyoming. They received an at-large bid to the Women's National Invitation Tournament where they defeated Texas and Rice in the first and second rounds before losing to TCU in the third round.

Roster

Schedule and results

|-
!colspan=9 style=| Exhibition

|-
!colspan=9 style=| Non-conference regular season

|-
!colspan=9 style=| Mountain West regular season

|-
!colspan=9 style=| Mountain West Women's Tournament

|-
!colspan=9 style=| WNIT

Rankings
2017–18 NCAA Division I women's basketball rankings

See also
2017-18 New Mexico Lobos men's basketball team

References

New Mexico
New Mexico Lobos women's basketball seasons
2017 in sports in New Mexico
2018 in sports in New Mexico
New Mexico